The 2001 Berlin Marathon was the 28th running of the annual marathon race held in Berlin, Germany, held on 30 September 2001. Kenya's Joseph Ngolepus (entering as a pacemaker) won the men's race in 2:08:47 hours, while the women's race was won by Japan's Naoko Takahashi in a world record time of 2:19:46.

Results

Men

Women

References 

 Results. Association of Road Racing Statisticians. Retrieved 2020-04-02.

External links 
 Official website

2001 in Berlin
Berlin Marathon
Berlin Marathon
Berlin Marathon
Berlin Marathon